La Coudre is a village in the canton of Vaud, Switzerland. It is part of the municipality of L'Isle.
Between 98 and 102 people live in La Coudre. The village has 22 dogs.  

Villages in the canton of Vaud

fr:La Coudre (Vaud)